The following is a list of fictional characters that appear, or are only mentioned briefly, in the 24 one-shots of Amalgam Comics. They are listed by comic book title and a team section is also provided. The amalgamations of characters or the Amalgam versions of one character are given. Plots of the Amalgam comic books are given in the list of Amalgam Comics publications and additional information about characters is provided in the references.

DC versus Marvel Comics/Marvel Comics versus DC #1–4 (February – May 1996)

First appearance in DC versus Marvel Comics #1 (February 1996)
 Access (Axel Asher).
 The Brothers
First appearance in Marvel Comics versus DC #3 (April 1996)
 Super-Soldier (Clark Kent). An amalgamation of DC's Superman (Kal-El/Clark Kent) and Marvel's (Captain America (Steve Rogers).
 The Dark Claw (Logan Wayne). An amalgamation of DC's the Batman (Bruce Wayne) and Marvel's the Wolverine (James "Logan" Howlett).
 Deadeye (Bill Lawton). An amalgamation of DC's Deadshot (Floyd Lawton) and Marvel's Bullseye.
 Doctor Doomsday (Victor von Doom). An amalgamation of DC's Doomsday and Marvel's Doctor Doom (Victor von Doom).
 Doctor Strangefate (Charles Xavier). An amalgamation of DC's Doctor Fate and Marvel's Doctor Strange and Professor X (Charles Xavier).
 Lethal (Sergei Minerva). An amalgamation of DC's the Cheetah (Barbara Ann Minerva) and Marvel's Kraven the Hunter (Sergei Nikolaevich Kravinoff).
 Nightcreeper (Kurt "Jack" Ryder). An amalgamation of DC's the Creeper (Jack Ryder) and Marvel's Nightcrawler (Kurt Wagner).
 The Skulk (Bruce Banner). An amalgamation of DC's Solomon Grundy and Marvel's the Hulk (Robert Bruce Banner).
 Spider-Boy (Peter Ross). An amalgamation of DC's Superboy and Marvel's Ben Reilly (a clone of Spider-Man (Peter Parker)).

April 1996 – DC Comics

Amazon #1
 Amazon (Princess Ororo of Themiscyra). An amalgamation of DC's Wonder Woman (Diana Prince) and Marvel's Storm (Ororo Munroe).

Assassins #1
 Catsai (Elektra Kyle). An amalgamation of DC's the Catwoman (Selina Kyle) and Marvel's Elektra.
 Dare the Terminator (Slade Murdock). A female amalgamation of DC's Deathstroke the Terminator (Slade Wilson) and Marvel's Daredevil (Matt Murdock).
 The Big Question (Edward Nigma Fisk). An amalgamation of DC's the Riddler (Edward Nigma) and Marvel's the Kingpin (Wilson Grant Fisk).
 Jimmy Urich. An amalgamation of DC's Jimmy Olsen and Marvel's Ben Urich.
 Wired (Nathan Chase). An amalgamation of DC's the Manhunter (Chase Lawler) and Marvel's Cable (Nathan Summers).
 J. Jonah White. An amalgamation of DC's Perry White and Marvel's J. Jonah Jameson.
 Winterstick. An amalgamation of DC's Wintergreen and Marvel's Stick.

Doctor Strangefate #1
 The Abominite. An amalgamation of DC's the Hellgrammite and Marvel's the Abomination.
 Myx. An amalgamation of DC's Mister Mxyzptlk and Marvel's Wong.
 Jade Nova (Frankie Rayner). An amalgamation of DC's Green Lantern (Kyle Rayner) and Jade and Marvel's Nova (Frankie Raye).
 The White Witch (Wanda Zatara). An amalgamation of DC's Zatanna Zatara and Marvel's the Scarlet Witch (Wanda Maximoff).
 Baron Wotan. An amalgamation of DC's Wotan and Marvel's Baron Mordo.
 Mephisatanus. An amalgamation of DC's Satanus and Marvel's Mephisto.

JLX #1
 Captain Marvel (William "Billy" Mar-Vell). An amalgamation of DC's Captain Marvel (Billy Batson) and Marvel's Captain Marvel (Mar-Vell).
 The Angelhawk (Warren Hall). An amalgamation of DC's Hawkman (Carter Hall) and Marvel's the Angel (Warren Worthington III).
 Goliath (Oliver Queen). An amalgamation of DC's Oliver Queen and Marvel's Goliath.
 Hawkeye (Clint Archer). An amalgamation of DC's the Green Arrow (Connor Hawke) and Marvel's Hawkeye (Clint Barton).
 The Canary (Dinah Barton). An amalgamation of DC's the Black Canary (Dinah Laurel Lance) and Marvel's the Mockingbird (Barbara Morse "Bobbi" Barton).
 The Wraith (Todd LeBeau). An amalgamation of DC's Obsidian (Todd Rice) and Marvel's Gambit (Remy LeBeau).
 Apollo (Ray Summers). An amalgamation of DC's the Ray (Raymond C. "Ray" Terrill) and Marvel's Cyclops (Scott Summers).
 Mister X (J'onn J'onzz). An amalgamation of both DC's the Martian Manhunter (J'onn J'onzz) and Marvel's Professor X (Charles Xavier) and DC's the Green Martians and Marvel's the Skrulls.
 Runaway. An amalgamation of DC's Gypsy (Cindy Reynolds) and Marvel's Rogue.
 The Aqua-Mariner (Arthur McKenzie). An amalgamation of DC's Aquaman (Arthur Curry) and Marvel's Namor the Sub-Mariner (Namor McKenzie).
 Firebird (Beatriz Grey). An amalgamation of DC's Fire (Beatriz da Costa) and Marvel's Phoenix (Jean Grey).
 Mercury (Pietro "Pete" Allen). An amalgamation of DC's Impulse (Bart Allen) and Marvel's Quicksilver (Pietro Maximoff).
 Will Magnus. An amalgamation of DC's Will Magnus and Marvel's Bolivar Trask.
 Jocasta. An amalgamation of DC's Platinum of the Metal Men and Marvel's Jocasta, the Sentinels and Millie the Model.
 Professor Kang. An amalgamation of DC's Professor Zoom the Reverse-Flash and Marvel's Kang the Conqueror.
 Apocalypso: An amalgamation of DC's Eclipso and Marvel's Apocalypse.
 Warlord Gh'ul. An amalgamation of DC's Ra's al Ghul and Marvel's Warlord Krang.
 Ms. Tique. DC's part of this amalgamation is unknown; Marvel's part is Mystique.

Legends of the Dark Claw #1
 The Hyena (Creed H. Quinn). An amalgamation of DC's the Joker (who once used the alias "Harlan Quinn" in DC's Batman #353 (November 1982)) and Marvel's Sabretooth (Victor Creed)
 The Huntress (Carol Danvers). An amalgamation of DC's the Huntress (Helena Bertinelli) and Marvel's Carol Danvers.
 Sparrow (Jubilation Lee). An amalgamation of DC's Robin (Tim Drake) and Marvel's Jubillee (Jubilation Lee).

Super-Soldier #1
 James Olsen. An Amalgam Universe version of DC's Jimmy Olsen with elements of Marvel's James Buchanan "Bucky" Barnes.
 The Green Skull (Lex Luthor). An amalgamation of DC's Lex Luthor and Marvel's the Red Skull.
 Ultra-Metallo. An amalgamation of DC's Metallo and Marvel's the First Sleeper.
 The Doomnaut. An amalgamation of DC's Doomsday and Marvel's the Juggernaut.

April 1996 – Marvel Comics

Bruce Wayne: Agent of S.H.I.E.L.D. #1
 Bruce Wayne. An Amalgam Universe version of DC's Bruce Wayne.
 Nick Fury. An Amalgam Universe version of Marvel's Nick Fury.
 Madame Cat (Selina Luthor). An amalgamation of DC's the Catwoman (Selina Kyle) and Marvel's Madame Hydra.
 Nuke (Bane Simpson). An amalgamation of DC's Bane and Marvel's Nuke (Frank Simpson).
 Baron Zero (Wolfgang von Strucker). An amalgamation of DC's Mr. Freeze (originally known as Mr. Zero) and Marvel's Baron Strucker (Baron Wolfgang von Strucker).
 Deathlok (Jason Todd). An amalgamation of DC's Jason Todd and Marvel's Deathlok and Midnight.
 The Black Bat (Barbara Hardy). An amalgamation of DC's Batgirl (Barbara Gordon) and Marvel's the Black Cat (Felicia Hardy).
 Moonwing (Dick Grayson). An amalgamation of DC's Nightwing (Dick Grayson) and Marvel's the Moon Knight (Marc Spector).
 Sgt. Rock. An Amalgam Universe version of DC's Sgt. Rock.
 Tony Stark. An Amalgam Universe version of Marvel's Tony Stark.

Bullets and Bracelets #1
 Diana Prince (Princess Diana of Themyscira). An Amalgam Universe version of DC's Wonder Woman (Diana Prince) with elements of Marvel's Elektra.
 The Punisher (Trevor Castle). An amalgamation of DC's Steve Trevor and Marvel's the Punisher (Frank Castle).
 The Bronze Panther. An amalgamation of DC's the Bronze Tiger and Marvel's the Black Panther.
 War Monarch (Jim Rhodes). An amalgamation of DC's Monarch and Marvel's War Machine (Jim Rhodes).
 Big Titania. An amalgamation of DC's Big Barda and Marvel's Titania.
 Bernadeth. An Amalgam Universe version of DC's Bernadeth.
 Lashina. An Amalgam Universe version of DC's Lashina.
 Mad Harriet. An Amalgam Universe version of DC's Mad Harriet.
 Stompa. An Amalgam Universe version of DC's Stompa.
 Granny Harkness. An amalgamation of DC's Granny Goodness and Marvel's Agatha Harkness.
 Thanoseid. An amalgamation of DC's Darkseid and Marvel's Thanos.
 Kanto. An Amalgam Universe version of DC's Kanto.
 Highfather Odin. An amalgamation of DC's Highfather and Marvel's Odin.
 Scott Free. An Amalgam Universe version of DC's Mister Miracle (Scott Free).

Magneto and the Magnetic Men #1
 Magneto (Erik Magnus). An amalgamation of DC's Will Magnus and Marvel's Magneto (Erik Lehnsherr).
 Antimony (Debbie Walker). An amalgamation of DC's Platinum and Debbi and Marvel's the Scarlet Witch and Patsy Walker.
 Bismuth (Snapper Jones). An amalgamation of DC's Tin and Snapper Carr and Marvel's the Toad and Rick Jones.
 Cobalt (Lucius Richmond). An amalgamation of DC's Gold and Lucius Fox and Marvel's Mastermind and Kyle Richmond.
 Nickel (Lance Vale). An amalgamation of DC's Mercury and Vicki Vale and Marvel's Quicksilver and Lance Bannon.
 Iron (John Henry Steele). An amalgamation of DC's Iron and Steel (John Henry Irons) and Marvel's Unus the Untouchable.
 Kokoro (Tatsu "Betsy" Braddock). An amalgamation of DC's Katana (Tatsu Yamashiro) and Marvel's Psylocke (Elizabeth "Betsy" Braddock).
 Sinistron. An amalgamation of DC's Psimon  and Marvel's Mister Sinister.

Speed Demon #1
 Hal "Madman" Jordan. An Amalgam Universe version of DC's Hal Jordan.
 Uatu the Guardian. An amalgamation of one of DC's the Guardians of the Universe and Marvel's Uatu, one of the Watchers.
 The Speed Demon (Blaze Allen). An amalgamation of DC's the Flash (Barry Allen), the Flash (Jay Garrick) and Etrigan the Demon and Marvel's the Ghost Rider (Johnny Blaze).
 Kid Demon (Wally Allen). An amalgamation of DC's Kid Flash (Wally West) and Marvel's the Ghost Rider (Danny Ketch).
 The Blob. An amalgamation of DC's Chunk and Marvel's the Blob.
 Miss Miracle. An amalgamation of DC's Mister Miracle and Marvel's Crystal.
 Puck. An amalgamation of DC's Oberon and Marvel's Puck.
 The Night Spectre. An amalgamation of DC's the Spectre and Marvel's Nightmare.
 The Two-Faced Goblin (Harvey Osborn). An amalgamation of DC's Two-Face (Harvey Dent) and Marvel's the Green Goblin (Norman Osborn).
 The Scarecrow. An amalgamation of DC's the Scarecrow and Marvel's the Scarecrow.
 Siliconman. An amalgamation of DC's Plastic Man and Marvel's the Sandman.
 The Arrowcaster. An amalgamation of DC's Speedy and Marvel's the Nightcaster.

Spider-Boy #1
 Bizarnage (symbiote). An amalgamation of DC's Bizarro and Marvel's Carnage.
 The Guardian Angel (Doctor Tom Harper). An amalgamation of DC's the Guardian (James Harper) and Marvel's the Angel (Thomas Halloway).
 King Lizard. An amalgamation of DC's King Shark and Marvel's the Lizard and Fin Fang Foom.
 "Brooklyn" Barnes. An amalgamation of DC's Daniel "Terrible" Turpin and "Brooklyn" and Marvel's James Buchanan "Bucky" Barnes.
 The Insect Queen (Mary Jane Watson). An amalgamation of DC's the Insect Queen (Lana Lang) and Marvel's Mary Jane Watson.
 Professor Dubbilex. An amalgamation of DC's Dubbilex and Marvel's Professor X.
 Mystallo. An amalgamation of DC's Metallo and Marvel's Mysterio.
 This issue also features Amalgam Universe versions of various non-amalgamated characters, including DC's Ray Palmer, Jack Ryder, Dabney Donovan, Rex Leech, Roxy Leech and Sam Makoa, and Marvel's Peter Parker, Hank Pym, Otto Octavius, Curt Connors, Thaddeus E. "Thunderbolt" Ross, J. Jonah Jameson, Betty Brant, and Flash Thompson.

X-Patrol #1
 The Beastling (Hank Logan). An amalgamation of DC's the Changeling (Garfield Logan) and Marvel's the Beast (Hank McCoy).
 Elastigirl. An amalgamation of DC's Elasti-Girl and Marvel's Domino and the Wasp.
 Ferro Man (Piotyr Rasputin). An amalgamation of DC's Ferro Lad and Marvel's Colossus.
 Niles Cable. An amalgamation of DC's the Chief (Niles Caulder) and Marvel's Cable and Professor X.
 Shatterstarfire. An amalgamation of DC's Starfire and Marvel's Shatterstar and Longshot.
 Dial H.U.S.K. (Paige Guthrie). An amalgamation of DC's Dial H for Hero and Marvel's Husk.
 Wonder Girl. An amalgamation of DC's Wonder Girl and Marvel's Wonder Man.
 Polaris. An amalgamation of DC's Doctor Polaris and Marvel's Polaris.
 Mary Marvel Girl. An amalgamation of DC's Mary Marvel and Marvel's Marvel Girl.
 Artemisty Knight. An amalgamation of DC's Artemis of Bana-Mighdall and Marvel's Misty Knight.

June 1997 – DC Comics

Bat-Thing #1
 Alicia Murdock the Little Blind Girl. An Amalgam Universe character of whom Marvel's part of the amalgamation is Alicia Masters and Daredevil (Matt Murdock). DC's part of the amalgamation is unknown.
 The Bat-Thing (Kirk Sallis). An amalgamation of DC's the Man-Bat (Robert Kirkland "Kirk" Langstrom) and Marvel's the Man-Thing (Ted Sallis).
 Bingle-Burry the Two-Headed Dog. An Amalgam Universe character of whom DC and Marvel's parts of the amalgamation are both unknown.
 Detective Clark Bullock. An Amalgam Universe version of DC's Harvey Bullock.
 Detective Christine Montoya. An Amalgam Universe version of DC's Renee Montoya.
 Francie-Ellen Sallis. An amalgamation of DC's Francine Langstrom and Marvel's Ellen Sallis.
 Howard the Mxztplx. An amalgamation of DC's Mister Mxyzptlk and Marvel's Howard the Duck (possibly, this name is misspelled).

Dark Claw Adventures #1
 Patch Malone (an alternate identity used by the Dark Claw). An amalgamation of DC's Matches Malone and Marvel's Patch.
 Lady Talia. An amalgamation of DC's Talia al Ghul and Marvel's Lady Deathstrike.
 Ra's a-Pocalypse. An amalgamation of DC's Ra's al Ghul and Marvel's Apocalypse.
 THX 1138. This is a reference to THX 1138 (1971), George Lucas' first feature film.
 Ubuwong. An amalgamation of DC's Ubu and Marvel's Wong.
 Cybercroc. An amalgamation of DC's Killer Croc and Marvel's Cyber.
 The Bloodcrow. An amalgamation of DC's the Scarecrow and Marvel's Bloodscream.
 Spiral Harley. An amalgamation of DC's Harley Quinn and Marvel's Spiral.
 The Omega Beast. An amalgamation of DC's the KGBeast and Marvel's Omega Red.

Generation Hex #1
 Jono Hex. An amalgamation of DC's Jonah Hex and Marvel's Chamber (Jonothon "Jono" Starsmore).
 Aurora Trigger. An amalgamation of DC's Wayne Trigger and Cinnamon and Marvel's Aurora.
 Northstar Trigger. An amalgamation of DC's Walter Trigger and Marvel's Northstar.
 Madame Banshee. An amalgamation of DC's Madame .44 and Marvel's the Banshee.
 Johnny Random. An amalgamation of DC's Johnny Thunder and Marvel's Random.
 Skinhunter. An amalgamation of DC's Scalphunter and Marvel's Skin.
 The White Whip. An amalgamation of DC's the Whip and Marvel's the White Queen (Emma Frost).
 Retribution. An amalgamation of DC's Firehair and Marvel's Penance.
 Marshal "Bat" Trask. An amalgamation of DC's Bat Lash and Marvel's Bolivar Trask.
 The Razormen. An amalgamation of DC's the Scissormen and Marvel's the Sentinels.
 Black Tom Savage. An amalgamation of DC's Vandal Savage and Marvel's Black Tom Cassidy.
 M-Parasiteplate. An amalgamation of DC's the Parasite and Marvel's Emplate.
 El Papamondo. An amalgamation of DC's El Diablo and Marvel's Mondo.
 Pow Wow Boom Boom Smith. An amalgamation of DC's Pow Wow Smith and Marvel's Boom Boom.
 The Six-Gun Triplicate Kid. An amalgamation of DC's Triplicate Girl and Marvel's the Two-Gun Kid.
 The Shaggynaut. An amalgamation of DC's the Shaggy Man and Marvel's the Juggernaut.
 Thunderchick. An amalgamation of DC's Nighthawk and Marvel's Siryn.

JLX Unleashed #1
 Savage Shaw. An amalgamation of DC's Vandal Savage and Marvel's Sebastian Shaw.
 Mistress Maxima. An amalgamation of DC's Maxima and Marvel's the White Queen (Emma Frost).
 Dark Firebird. An amalgamation of DC's Fire (Beatriz de Costa) and Marvel's Dark Phoenix (Jean Grey).
 Lord Maxwell Hodge. An amalgamation of DC's Maxwell Lord and Marvel's Cameron Hodge.
 Mephiston. An amalgamation of DC's Neron and Marvel's Mephisto.
 Fin Fang Flame. An amalgamation of DC's Brimstone and Marvel's Fin Fang Foom.
 Mongslaught. An amalgamation of DC's Mongul and Marvel's Onslaught.
 The Iceberg. An amalgamation of DC's Ice and Marvel's the Iceman.
 Sunfirestorm. An amalgamation of DC's Firestorm the Nuclear Man and Marvel's Sunfire.
 Chaos (Joshua Summers). An amalgamation of DC's Spitfire and Marvel's Havok.
 Dum Dum Dugan. An Amalgam Universe version of Marvel's Dum Dum Dugan.

Lobo the Duck #1
 Lobo the Duck. An amalgamation of DC's Lobo and Marvel's Howard the Duck.
 The Impossible Dawg. An amalgamation of DC's Dawg and Marvel's the Impossible Man.
 Vikki Valkyrie. An amalgamation of DC's Vicki Vale and Marvel's the Valkyrie.
 Hawkhawk. An amalgamation of DC's Hawkman and Marvel's Nighthawk.
 Doctor Bongface. An amalgamation of DC's Scarface and Marvel's Doctor Bong.
 Al Forbush. An amalgamation of DC's Ma Hunkel and Marvel's Blind Al and Irving Forbush.
 Bevarlene. An amalgamation of DC's Darlene Spritzer and Marvel's Beverly Switzler.
 Ambush the Lunatik. An amalgamation of DC's Ambush Bug and Marvel's Lunatik.
 Jonas Turnip. An amalgamation of DC's Jonas Glim and Marvel's the Space Turnip.
 Daryl Rutabaga. An amalgamation of elements of DC's Jonas Glim and elements of Marvel's the Space Turnip.
 Billie the Millie. An amalgamation of DC's Billy the Girl and Marvel's Millie the Model.
 Gamorola. An amalgamation of DC's Princess Shao-La and Marvel's Gamora.
 Gold-Kidney Lady. An amalgamation of DC's Goldstar and Marvel's the Kidney Lady.
 The Godthing. An amalgamation of DC's Gawd and Marvel's the Chair-Thing.

Super-Soldier: Man of War #1
 The American Belle. An amalgamation of DC's the Liberty Belle and Marvel's Miss America.
 The Human Lantern. An amalgamation of DC's the Golden Age Green Lantern and Marvel's the android version of the Human Torch.
 The Whiz. An amalgamation of DC's Jay Garrick, the Golden Age Flash and Marvel's the Whizzer.
 Sgt. Rock. An Amalgam Comics version of Sgt. Rock.
 Wildman Percy. An amalgamation of DC's Wildman and Marvel's Percy "Pinky" Pinkerton.
 Little Dum Dum. An amalgamation of DC's Little Sure Shot and Marvel's Dum Dum Dugan.
 Bulldozer Gabriel. An amalgamation of DC's Bulldozer and Marvel's Gabriel "Gabe" Jones.
 Ice-Cream Cohen. An amalgamation of DC's Ice Cream Soldier and Marvel's Izzy Cohen.
 Rebel Farmer. An amalgamation of DC's Farmer Boy and Marvel's "Rebel" Ralston.
 Dino Four-Eyes. An amalgamation of DC's Four Eyes and Marvel's Dino Manelli.
 Mademoiselle Peggy. An amalgamation of DC's Mademoiselle Marie and Marvel's Peggy Carter.
 Major Zemo. An amalgamation of DC's Iron Major and Marvel's Baron Zemo.

June 1997 – Marvel Comics

Challengers of the Fantastic #1
 Prof (Reed Richards). An amalgamation of DC's Prof Haley and Marvel's Mister Fantastic.
 Ace (Susan Storm). An amalgamation of DC's Ace Morgan and Marvel's the Invisible Woman.
 Red (Johnny Storm). An amalgamation of DC's Red Ryan and Marvel's the Human Torch.
 Rocky (Ben Grimm). An amalgamation of DC's Rocky Davis and the Four-Armed Terror and Marvel's the Thing.
 Comrade Grodd. An amalgamation of DC's Gorilla Grodd and the Super Apes employed by Marvel's the Red Ghost. 
 Congo-Red. An amalgamation of DC's Congorilla and the Super Apes employed by Marvel's the Red Ghost.
 The Red Ghost (Kragoff). An Amalgam Universe version of Marvel's the Red Ghost (Ivan Kragoff) with some elements of DC's Gorilla City.
 Vykin the Black Bolt. An amalgamation of DC's Vykin the Black and Marvel's Black Bolt.
 Dream Crystal. An amalgamation of DC's Beautiful Dreamer and Marvel's Crystal.
 Medusa Moonrider. An amalgamation of DC's Mark Moonrider and Marvel's Medusa.
 Big Gorgon. An amalgamation of DC's Big Bear and Marvel's Gorgon.
 Triserinak. An amalgamation of DC's Serifan and Marvel's Triton and Karnak the Shatterer.
 Wyatt Flying Stag. An amalgamation of DC's Super-Chief (Flying Stag) and Marvel's Wyatt Wingfoot.
 Galactiac. An amalgamation of DC's Brainiac and Marvel's Galactus.
 The Silver Racer (Willie Lincoln). An amalgamation of DC's the Black Racer and Marvel's the Silver Surfer.
 Vicky Sheldon. An amalgamation of DC's Vicki Vale and Marvel's Phil Sheldon.
 June Masters. An amalgamation of DC's June Robbins and Marvel's Alicia Masters. 
 The Multi-Master. An amalgamation of DC's the Multi-Man and Marvel's the Puppet Master.
 Ultivac the Multi-Robot. An amalgamation of multiple DC and Marvel characters, including DC's Ultivac and Ultra the Multi-Alien and Marvel's the Destroyer, Machine Man and Galactus’s Punisher robots.
 Diablo the Volcano Man. An amalgamation of DC's the Volcano Man and Marvel's Diablo.
 Drabny the Fixer. An amalgamation of DC's Drabny and Marvel's the Fixer.
 The Radioactive Kra. An amalgamation of DC's Kra the Living Robot and Marvel's the Radioactive Man.
 Cosbie. An amalgamation of DC's Cosmo and Marvel's H.E.R.B.I.E.
 Corinna Evans. An amalgamation of DC's Corinna Stark and Marvel's Doris Evans.
 The Banisher. An amalgamation of DC's Bane and Marvel's the Punisher.

The Exciting X-Patrol #1
 Jericho (Niles Dayspring). An amalgamation of DC's Jericho and Marvel's X-Man.
 Brother Brood (Sebastian Brood). An amalgamation of DC's Brother Blood (Sebastian Blood VIII) and Marvel's the Brood species.
 Raveniya Dayspring. An amalgamation of DC's Raven and Marvel's Aliya Dayspring.
 Terra-X. An amalgamation of DC's Terra and Marvel's Terrax the Tamer.
 Black Orchid the Unknown. An amalgamation of DC's the Black Orchid and Marvel's Omega the Unknown.
 Prez, Master of Kung Fu. An amalgamation of DC's Prez and Marvel's Shang-Chi, Master of Kung Fu.
 The Sea Devil Dinosaurs. An amalgamation of DC's the Sea Devils and Marvel's Devil Dinosaur.
 The Vigilante Kid. An amalgamation of DC's the Vigilante and Marvel's the Rawhide Kid.
 Deaddevil, the Man without Life. An amalgamation of DC's Deadman and Marvel's Daredevil, the Man without Fear.
 The Silver Tornado. An amalgamation of DC's the Red Tornado and Marvel's the Silver Centurion.
 The Atomic Black Knight. An amalgamation of DC's Atomic Knight and Marvel's Black Knight (Dane Whitman).
 X-Stroke the Eliminator. An amalgamation of DC's Deathstroke the Terminator and Marvel's the X-Cutioner.
 Amanda Deathbird. An amalgamation of DC's Amanda Waller and Marvel's Deathbird.
 Hawk and Dagger. An amalgamation of DC's the Hawk and the Dove and Marvel's Cloak and Dagger.

Iron Lantern #1
 Iron Lantern (Hal Stark). An amalgamation of DC's Green Lantern (Hal Jordan) and Marvel's Iron Man (Tony Stark).
 Oa the Living Planet. An amalgamation of DC's Oa, the homeworld of the Guardians of the Universe, and Marvel's Ego the Living Planet.
 H.E.C.T.O.R. (Highly Evolved Creature Totally Oriented for Revenge). An amalgamation of DC's Hector Hammond and Marvel's MODOK (Mental Organism Designed Only for Killing).
 Rhomann Sur. An amalgamation of DC's Abin Sur and Marvel's Rhomann Dey.
 Madame Sapphire (Pepper Ferris). An amalgamation of DC's Star Sapphire (Carol Ferris) and Marvel's Madame Masque and Pepper Potts.
 Senator Harrington Ferris. An amalgamation of DC's Carl Ferris and Marvel's Senator Harrington Byrd.
 Happy Kalmaku. An amalgamation of DC's Thomas "Pieface" Kalmaku and Marvel's Harold Joseph "Happy" Hogan.
 Stewart Rhodes. An amalgamation of DC's John Stewart and Marvel's Jim Rhodes.
 The Green Guardsman (Kyle O'Brien). An amalgamation of DC's Green Lantern (Kyle Rayner) and Marvel's the Guardsman (Kevin O'Brien).
 Gardner. An Amalgam Universe version of DC's Guy Gardner.
 Gyrich. An Amalgam Universe version of Marvel's Henry Peter Gyrich.
 The Great White. An amalgamation of DC's the Shark and Marvel's Ultimo.
 Mandarinestro. An amalgamation of DC's Sinestro and Marvel's Mandarin.
 Black Brand. An amalgamation of DC's Black Hand and Marvel's Firebrand.
 The Sonicorn. An amalgamation of DC's Sonar and Marvel's the Unicorn.
 Doctor Whiplash. An amalgamation of DC's Doctor Polaris and Marvel's Whiplash.
 Olivia Stane. An amalgamation of DC's Olivia Reynolds and Marvel's Obadiah Stane.
 Janice Doremus. An amalgamation of DC's Eve Doremus and Marvel's Janice Cord.
 Iron Lantern 5700 (Arno Manning). An amalgamation of DC's Pol Manning (an identity used by Hal Jordan in the year 5700) and Marvel's Iron Man 2020 (Arno Stark).
 Sunset Vane. An amalgamation of DC's Iona Vane and Marvel's Sunset Bain.

The Magnetic Men featuring Magneto #1
 The Black Vulture. An amalgamation of DC's the Black Condor and Marvel's the Vulture.
 Chemodam. An amalgamation of DC's Chemo and Marvel's MODAM (Mental Organism Designed for Aggressive Manuvers).
 Deathborg. An amalgamation of DC's Cyborg and Marvel's Deathlok.
 Kultron. An amalgamation of DC's Kobra and Marvel's Ultron.
 Quasimodox. An amalgamation of DC's Vril Dox and Marvel's Quasimodo.
 Soniklaw. An amalgamation of DC's Sonar and Marvel's Klaw.
 Vance Cosmic. An amalgamation of DC's Cosmic Boy and Marvel's Vance Astro.
 Mr. Mastermind. An amalgamation of DC's Mister Mind and Marvel's Mastermind.
 The Impossible Mod. An amalgamation of DC's the Mad Mod and Marvel's the Impossible Man.
 Detective Dinosaur. An amalgamation of DC's Detective Chimp and Marvel's Devil Dinosaur.

Spider-Boy Team-Up #1
 Agamotto Empress. An amalgamation of DC's the Emerald Empress and Marvel's Eye of Agamotto.
 Bouncing Ball. An amalgamation of DC's Bouncing Boy and Marvel's Speedball (Robbie Baldwin).
 Cannonfire. An amalgamation of DC's Wildfire and Marvel's Cannonball.
 Chameleon. An amalgamation of DC's Chameleon Boy and Marvel's the Chameleon.
 Darkstar. An amalgamation of DC's Shadow Lass and Marvel's Darkstar.
 Dream Date. An amalgamation of DC's Dream Girl and Marvel's Destiny.
 Fantastic Lad. An amalgamation of DC's Elastic Lad and Marvel's Mister Fantastic.
 Growing Boy / Living Colossus. An amalgamation of DC's Leviathan / Micro Lad (Gim Allon) and Marvel's It! The Living Colossus.
 Invisible Girl. An amalgamation of DC's Invisible Kid and Marvel's the Invisible Woman.
 Kang the Time Conqueror / Chronos-Tut the Time Pharaoh. An amalgamation of DC's the Time Trapper and Chronos and Marvel's Kang the Conqueror and Rama-Tut.
 Lady Bug. An amalgamation of DC's Shrinking Violet and Marvel's the Wasp.
 Living Lightning Lad / 'Lectron. An amalgamation of DC's Lightning Lad and Marvel's Electro and the Living Lightning.
 Manorb. An amalgamation of DC's Mano and Marvel's the Orb.
 Martinex 5. An amalgamation of DC's Brainiac 5 and Marvel's Martinex.
 Molecule Lad / Nucleus. An amalgamation of DC's Element Lad and Marvel's the Molecule Man.
 Multiple Maid / Myriad. An amalgamation of DC's Triplicate Girl and Marvel's the Multiple Man.
 Paste-Eater Pete. An amalgamation of DC's Matter-Eater Lad and Marvel's Paste Pot Pete (later known as the Trapster).
 Phantomcat. An amalgamation of DC's Phantom Girl and Marvel's Shadowcat.
 Phoenetix. An amalgamation of DC's Kinetix and Marvel's Rachel Summers.
 Psi-Girl. An amalgamation of DC's Saturn Girl and Marvel's Psylocke.
 The Scavulture. An amalgamation of DC's the Scavenger and Marvel's the Vulture.
 Shadowstar. An amalgamation of DC's Shadow Lass and Marvel's Starhawk.
 Star Charlie / Mass. An amalgamation of DC's Star Boy and Marvel's Charlie-27.
 Living Lightning Lass / Sparkler. An amalgamation of DC's Lightning Lass and Marvel's the Dazzler.
 Spartacus. An amalgamation of DC's the Persuader and Marvel's the Gladiator.
 Spider-Boy 2099 (Mig-El Gand). An amalgamation of DC's Mon-El (Lar Gand) and Marvel's Spider-Man 2099 (Miguel O'Hara).
 Sun Lord. An amalgamation of DC's Sun Boy and Marvel's Firelord.
 Tharlock. An amalgamation of DC's Tharok and Marvel's Deathlok.
 Timberwolf by Night. An amalgamation of DC's Timber Wolf and Marvel's the Werewolf by Night.
 Universe Boy. An amalgamation of DC's Ultra Boy and Marvel's Captain Universe.
 Valinus. An amalgamation of DCs' Validus and Marvel's Terminus.
 Xcel. An amalgamation of DC's XS and Marvel's Quicksilver.

Thorion of the New Asgods #1
 Thorion. An amalgamation of DC's Orion and Marvel's Thor.
 L'ok D'saad. An amalgamation of DC's DeSaad and Marvel's Loki.
 Bald'r Lightbringer. An amalgamation of DC's Lightray and Marvel's Balder the Brave.
 Don Free. An amalgamation of DC's Scott Free and Marvel's Donald "Don" Blake.
 Oberon Foster. An amalgamation of DC's Oberon and Marvel's Jane Foster.
 Big Sif. An amalgamation of DC's Big Barda and Marvel's Sif.
 Heimron. An amalgamation of DC's Metron and Marvel's Heimdall.
 Infinity the Beta-Ray Man. An amalgamation of DC's Infinity-Man and Marvel's Beta Ray Bill.
 Steppenorn the Wolf Queen. An amalgamation of DC's Steppenwolf and Marvel's Karnilla the Norn Queen.
 Granny Gullin the Boar God. An amalgamation of DC's Granny Goodness and Marvel's Gullin the Boar God.
 The Absorbing Bug. An amalgamation of DC's Forager and Marvel's the Absorbing Man.
 Devilance the Storm-Giant. An amalgamation of DC's Devilance the Pursuer and Marvel's version of the Storm Giants of Norse mythology.
 The Enchanted Tigra. An amalgamation of DC's Tigra and Marvel's the Enchantress.

Teams

 The 100 – First mentioned in Iron Lantern #1.
An Amalgam Universe version of DC's the 100.
 The All-Star Winners Squadron – First appeared in Super-Soldier: Man of War #1. Headquarters: Midtown Clubhouse, 1940s Metropolis.
An amalgamation of DC's the All-Star Squadron and Marvel's the All-Winners Squad.
Members: the American Belle, the Human Lantern, the Aqua-Mariner, Super-Soldier, the Whiz, and "Brooklyn" Barnes (mascot)
 The Brotherhood of Injustice – First mentioned in JLX #1.
An amalgamation of DC's the Injustice League and Marvel's the Brotherhood of Evil Mutants.
Members: Ms. Tique.
Former members: Runaway.
 The Challengers of the Fantastic – First appeared in Challengers of the Fantastic #1.
An amalgamation of DC's the Challengers of the Unknown and Marvel's the Fantastic Four.
Members: Reed "Prof" Richards, Ben "Rocky" Grimm, Johnny "Red" Storm, Susan "Ace" Storm
 The Challenger Haters of Evil – First appeared in Challengers of the Fantastic #1.
An amalgamation of DC's the League of Challenger-Haters and Marvel's the Masters of Evil.
Members: the Multi-Master, Diablo the Volcano Man, Drabny the Fixer, the Radioactive Kra, Ultivac the Multi-Robot
 The Female Furies – First appeared in Bullets and Bracelets #1.
An Amalgam Universe version of DC's the Female Furies.
Members: Bernadeth, Lashina, Mad Harriet, Stompa
Former members: Big Titania
 Generation Hex – First appeared in Generation Hex #1.
An amalgamation of DC's Jonah Hex and Marvel's Generation X.
Members: Jono Hex, Aurora Trigger, El Papamondo, Johnny Random, Madame Banshee, Northstar Trigger, Retribution, Skinhunter, the White Whip
 The Hellfire League of Injustice – First appeared in JLX Unleashed #1.
An amalgamation of DC's the Injustice League and Marvel's version of the Hellfire Club.
Members: Savage Shaw, Lord Maxwell Hodge, Dark Firebird, Mistress Maxima
 The Howling Commandos – First appeared in Super-Soldier: Man of War #1.
An amalgamation of DC's Easy Company and Marvel's the Howling Commandos.
Members: Sgt. Rock, Wildman Percy, Little Dum Dum, Bulldozer Gabriel, Ice-Cream Cohen, Rebel Farmer, Dino Four-Eyes.
 HYDRA – First appeared in Super-Soldier #1.
An Amalgam Universe version of Marvel's HYDRA.
 The Imperial Suicide Squad – First mentioned in The Exciting X-Patrol #1.
An amalgamation of DC's the Suicide Squad and Marvel's the Imperial Guard.
Members: Amanda Deathbird.
 The Judgment League Avengers (JLA) – First appeared in JLX #1.
An amalgamation of DC's the Justice League of America (JLA) and Marvel's the Avengers.
Members: Super-Soldier, the Dark Claw, the Speed Demon, Iron Lantern, the Aqua-Mariner, Mister X, the Canary, Captain Marvel, Goliath, Hawkeye, Blue Jacket, Wonder-Gold, the Red Vision, Thorion, Iron Lantern, the White Witch, the Angelhawk
 The Justice League X-Men (JLX) – First appeared in JLX #1.
An amalgamation of DC's the Justice League of America (JLA) and Marvel's the X-Men.
Members: Mister X, Apollo, Firebird, the Iceberg, Amazon, Runaway, the Aqua-Mariner, Chaos, Mercury
 The Legion of Galactic Guardians 2099 – First appeared in Spider-Boy Team Up #1.
An amalgamation of DC's the Legion of Super-Heroes and Marvel's 2099 universe and the 1969 version of the Guardians of the Galaxy.
Members: Bouncing Ball, Cannonfire, Chameleon, Darkstar, Dream Date, Fantastic Lad, Invisible Girl, Lady Bug, 'Lectron, Living Colossus, Martinex 5, Mass, Myriad, Nucleus, Paste-Eater Pete, Phantomcat, Phoenetix, Psi-Girl, Shadowstar, Sparkler, Spider-Boy 2099, Sun Lord, Timberwolf By Night, Universe Boy, Vance Cosmic, Xcel
 The New York Special Crimes Unit – First appeared in Spider-Boy #1. Headquarters: New York, New York.
An amalgamation of DC's the Metropolis Special Crimes Unit and Marvel's version of the New York Police Department.
Members: Captain Sam Makoa, Roxy Leech, "Flash" Thompson, "Brookyn" Barnes
 The Offending Society – First mentioned in Lobo the Duck #1.
An amalgamation of DC's the Justice Society of America (JSA) and Marvel's the Defenders.
Members: Doctor Strangefate, the Skulk, Vikki Valkyrie, Hawkhawk
 The Quentin Carnival – First appeared in Speed Demon #1.
An Amalgam Universe version of Marvel's the Quentin Carnival.
Members: Blaze Allen (the Speed Demon), the Blob, "the Clown", "the Flying Gambonnos", Miss Miracle, Puck, "the Ringmaster", Wally Allen (Kid Demon)
 The Shadow Guild – First appeared in JLX Unleashed #1.
An amalgamation of elements of DC's Obsidian and Marvel's the Thieves' Guild.
Member: the Wraith (Todd LeBeau)
 The Sinister Society – First appeared in The Magnetic Men featuring Magneto #1.
An amalgamation of DC's the Secret Society of Super Villains and Marvel's the Sinister Six.
Members: Kultron, Deathborg, the Black Vulture, Soniklaw, Vance Cosmic
 The Terrible Three – First appeared in Speed Demon #1.
An amalgamation of DC's the Terrible Trio and Marvel's the Sinister Six.
Members: the Scarecrow, Siliconman, the Two-Faced Goblin
 The Un-People – First appeared in Challengers of the Fantastic #1. Headquarters: Super Town, New Asgard.
An amalgamation of DC's the Forever People and Marvel's the Inhumans.
Members: Big Gorgon, Dream Crystal, Medusa Moonrider, Triserinak, Vykin the Black Bolt
 The X-Patrol – First appeared in X-Patrol #1. Headquarters: the X-Building.
An amalgamation of DC's the Doom Patrol and the Teen Titans and Marvel's the X-Men.
Members: the Beastling, Ravenyia Dayspring, Niles Cable, Shatterstarfire, Dial H.U.S.K., Jericho, Ferro Man, Elasti-Girl
 The Weaponers of A.I.M. – First mentioned in Iron Lantern #1.
An amalgamation of DC's the Weaponers of Qward and Marvel's A.I.M. (Advanced Idea Mechanics).

References

External links
 Who's Who: Handbook of the Amalgam Universe

 
Lists of DC Comics characters
Lists of Marvel Comics characters
Merged fictional characters